Atelier Double (アトリエドゥーブル) was a developer creating games under contract for various companies, producing games for MSX 2, Game Boy and Sega Saturn founded in 1986 and defunct in 2004.

Games developed

NES 
 A Ressha de Ikou (Japan only)
 The Bard's Tale
 The Bard's Tale II (Japan only)
 Dragons of Flame (Japan only)
 Kujaku Ou II
 Tamura Mistuaki no Mahjong Seminar (Japan only)
 Winter Games

MSX2 

 Fantasy Zone II (1989)

Game Boy 

 Penguin Land (1990)

Super NES/Super Famicom

 Power Lode Runner (1999, Japan only)

PlayStation 

 Tsuribaka Nisshi (1996, Shogakukan)
 Ranma ½: Battle Renaissance (1996, Rumic Soft/Shogakukan)

Windows / Mac 

 Parking Meijin (1996, Teichiku)

Saturn 

 2TaxGold (1997, Human Entertainment)
 Zap! Snow Boarding Trix (1997, Pony Canyon)
 Ninja Jajamaru-kun: Onigiri Ninpouchou Gold (1997, Jaleco)
 Zap! Snow Boarding Trix '98 (1997, Pony Canyon)

References 

1986 establishments in Japan
2004 disestablishments in Japan
Defunct video game companies of Japan
Japanese companies established in 1986
Video game companies disestablished in 2004
Video game companies established in 1986
Video game development companies